James Holder is a British businessman who co-founded the fashion brand Superdry.

Early life 
Born in Studley, Warwickshire, he was brought up in Stratford-upon-Avon and went to college in Leamington Spa where he studied graphic design. As a teenager, he enjoyed reading comics.

Holder started his career in fashion by selling T-shirts from the back of his mother's car at BMX events. He went on to found the skateboarder label Bench. He was made bankrupt in 1998. While running Bench, Holder met Julian Dunkerton, who made a large order of Holder's products. They later travelled to Japan together before founding Superdry.

Career 
In 2003, Holder co-founded Superdry with Julian Dunkerton as a market stall in Cheltenham. In 2004, they opened the brand's first physical store in Covent Garden, London. Holder was responsible for clothing design and brand development at the company.

Holder said that he and Dunkerton spotted a "huge gap" in the UK men's market. He has said that the initial inspiration for the brand was Dunkerton's love of Americana and his love of Japan and typography.

In 2005, Superdry experienced a period of growth after David Beckham was seen wearing the brand.

In 2010, the business was floated. Holder led Superdry's product innovation division until 2016. Holder also led SuperDesignLab, which was responsible for launching spin-off brand Superdry Sport.

In 2016, Holder resigned from the company, but continues to hold a stake.

In 2018, Holder joined fellow co-founder Julian Dunkerton in criticising Superdry's business strategy, claiming that it was unable to compete with ASOS.com.

In 2019, Holder founded JACK1T and Trench London. Both went into Administration in Spring 2021.

Personal life 
He lives with his wife Charlotte, a lawyer, and their son and daughter.

References

1971 births
Living people
British designers
British fashion designers
British retail company founders
People from Stratford-upon-Avon